The DFB-Pokal 2011–12 was the 32nd season of the cup competition, Germany's second-most important title in women's football.

Participating clubs
The following teams were qualified for the DFB-Pokal:

Results

Round 1
The draw for the first round was held on 14 July 2011. The nine best clubs of the previous Bundesliga season, 1. FFC Turbine Potsdam, 1. FFC Frankfurt, FCR 2001 Duisburg, Hamburger SV, FC Bayern München, SC 07 Bad Neuenahr, VfL Wolfsburg, Bayer 04 Leverkusen and SG Essen-Schönebeck were awarded byes for the first round. Starting times were terminated on 25 July 2011. The three Bundesliga clubs moved on.

Round of 32
The draw for the second round was held on 18 August 2011. Games were terminated on 30 August 2011.

1. The match Jahn Calden vs Leipzig was abandoned in the 69th minute due to bad weather. Leipzig was leading 1–0.  It was replayed on 17 September 2011.

Round of 16
The draw for the round of 16 was held on 17 September 2011. The matches were played on 30 October 2011.

Quarterfinals
The quarterfinals were held on 3 and 4 December 2011. FSV Gütersloh 2009 was the sole remaining second league team. The matches were played on 3 and 4 December 2011.

Semifinals
The semifinals were drawn on 21 December 2011. And dated on 15 February 2012.

Final
The final was held on May 12.

Top goalscorers

References

Women
DFB-Pokal Frauen seasons
pokal